St. Anthony Hospital, previously known as St. Anthony Central Hospital, is one of five Level I Trauma Centers in Colorado. The hospital is currently located at W. 2nd Pl and Routt St near the Denver Federal Center in Lakewood, Colorado. The hospital was previously located at W. 16th Ave and Raleigh St, in the West Colfax neighborhood of Denver.

St Anthony's is part of Colorado's largest health network, The Centura Health Network.

History

Starting as a dream of the Sisters of St. Francis, the hospital was opened in 1892. and dedicated on June 13, 1893.

In 2011, the hospital was moved to a new campus and renamed to St. Anthony Hospital in the process. The transition to the new campus occurred in two stages with the new Emergency Department opening on June 17, 2011, and the main hospital opening on June 20, 2011. As of August 2019, The CEO of St. Anthony Hospital is Peter Powers and the COO is Mary Albers.

Emergency Medical Services
St Anthony Flight for Life service began in 1972. Flight for Life was the first airborne ambulance service in the nation.

The nation's first EMT and Paramedic academy was started in 1974 at St Anthony Central.

St. Anthony provides medical directorship to over 50 Prehospital Agencies, to include Fire Departments, Ambulance Services, Search and Rescue Organizations, and certain Law Enforcement Agencies

See also
Denver Health Medical Center
Swedish Medical Center (Colorado)
Flight for Life

References

Hospital buildings completed in 1892
Hospital buildings completed in 2011
Lakewood, Colorado
Buildings and structures in Denver
Hospitals in Colorado
1892 establishments in Colorado
Postmodern architecture in Colorado
Religious organizations established in 1892
Hospitals established in 1892